Salsuginibacillus halophilus is a Gram-positive, halophilic, alkalitolerant, endospore-forming and rod-shaped bacterium from the genus of Salsuginibacillus which has been isolated from sediments from the Xiarinaoer soda lake in Mongolia.

References

 

Bacillaceae
Bacteria described in 2010